Rashnah is a village in the Mudiyah District in Abyan Governorate, Yemen.
and according to the census done in 2004, there were then 55 residents in the village.

Populated places in Abyan Governorate
Villages in Yemen
Society of Yemen